The 1999 Liberty Bowl was a college football postseason bowl game played on December 31, 1999, at Liberty Bowl Memorial Stadium in Memphis, Tennessee. The 41st edition of the Liberty Bowl matched the Colorado State Rams and the Southern Miss Golden Eagles. The game was sponsored by the Axa Equitable Life Insurance Company and was branded as the AXA Liberty Bowl. Southern Miss won the game 23–17; the game was highlighted by Southern Miss's strong defense, which scored two touchdowns and held Colorado State scoreless in the second half.

References

Liberty Bowl
Colorado State Rams football bowl games
Southern Miss Golden Eagles football bowl games
Liberty Bowl